Rospigg is a person from Roslagen. The name origins from the old Swedish word "rosbyggiar" - inhabitant in Roden. The word has thus nothing to do with the word "pigg" which is the Swedish word for "quill".

Rospigg is also an alternative name for the boat type "Roslagsskuta".

The word is also used in the name for the speedway team "Rospiggarna" in Hallstavik.

Linguists and historians consider that "Rospigg" might be related to the name of the Medieval Rus' people, Swedes who settled in what are now Russia and Ukraine and from whose name the names "Russia" and "Russian" developed.

References

Geographic history of Sweden
Swedish words and phrases
Uppland